Geoffrey Mostyn Murphy (19 May 1922 – 14 February 2011) was an Australian boxer who fought under the name Tommy Burns (after the Canadian boxer). He was born in Mullumbimby, New South Wales, but spent most of his life in the neighbouring Australian state of Queensland.

Murphy chose his fighting name in honour of the Canadian heavyweight boxer and former world champion, Tommy Burns, who lost his title to Jack Johnson in Australia in 1908.

In 1947, he won the Australian Welterweight Championship and fought many of the best Australian boxers of his era, becoming a crowd favourite. He appeared in the 1949 Charles Chauvel Australian movie Sons of Matthew.

Murphy, as Tommy Burns, was inducted into the Australian National Boxing Hall of Fame in 2004.

He died on 14 February 2011.

Sources
The Australian Film and Television Companion, ed. Tony Harrison pub. Simon and Schuster, Australia 1994

External links

Neil Bennetts interview at National Library of Australia
Biographical information supplied to National Library by son Peter Murphy in December 2009
Boxing record at BoxRec

References

1922 births
2011 deaths
People from the Northern Rivers
Australian male boxers
Welterweight boxers
Sportsmen from New South Wales